Tlatolqaca was an Aztec prince, son of Emperor Acamapichtli and Queen Huitzilxotzin, grandson of Princess Atotoztli I, half-brother of Emperors Huitzilihuitl and Itzcoatl, an uncle of Chimalpopoca and Moctezuma I.

He married Princess Matlalxochtzin and couple had three sons:
Cahualtzin
Tetlepanquetzatzin 
Tecatlapohuatzin.

Sources 

Tenochca nobility
Nobility of the Americas